Keev (Sanskrit:) is a name of Krishna from the Hindu tradition. The name appears in the 108 names of Krishna in the Gaudiya Vaishnavism.  Keev is named after mother Devaki and father Vasudeva, and is generally used for the child form of Krishna and depicts his prankful nature.

Scriptural references

Gaudiya Vaishnavism 
According to Chaitanya Mahaprabhu’s commentary on the Gaudiya Vaishnavism, "Keev" has the following meanings: 
 One who is mischievous
 The prodigious son
 entity that takes after Krishna, “Krishna-Jeev”

See also 
 Balakrishna
 Balgopal
 Chaitanya Mahaprabhu

References 

Dictionary of Hindu Lore and Legend by Anna Dhallapiccola

External links 
 An overview of Gaudiya Vaishnavism - (gaudiya.com)

Titles and names of Krishna